Dearborn Seminary was a private school for girls in the U.S. state of Illinois. Dearborn Seminary was incorporated in September, 1855, as a school for girls, and was at one time the oldest institution of its kind in Chicago.
It was for many years under the charge of Zuinglius Grover. From 1885 until 1899, Jennie F. Purington, later a member of the Board of Trustees, was principal of the seminary. In 1899, the school was reincorporated and became affiliated with the University of Chicago. It was located at 2252 Calumet Avenue. The course of study was arranged for preparation for college. In addition to the academic department, there were intermediate, primary, and kindergarten departments.

Notable people
 Lucy M. Hall (1843-1907), physician, writer
Harriet Monroe, poet and editor

References

Bibliography

Attribution

Defunct private schools in Chicago
Girls' schools in Illinois
Defunct girls' schools in the United States
1855 establishments in Illinois
Educational institutions established in 1855
University of Chicago